Kallitype is a process for making photographic prints.

Patented in 1889 by W. W. J. Nicol (1855-1929), the Kallitype print is an iron-silver process. A chemical process similar to the Van Dyke brown based on the use of a combination of ferric and silver salts. While Van Dyke brown and argyrotype use ferric ammonium citrate, the light-sensitive element used for the Kallitype is ferric oxalate. The use of ferric oxalate allows for both extended shadow definition (higher DMAX) and contrast control.

Many developing solutions can be used to give a different image color (brown, sepia, blue, maroon and black). Kallitype images generally have a richer tonal range than the cyanotype. These prints were popular in the 19th century, and then their popularity faded away. Sometimes known as "the poor man's platinum print", when the image is toned in platinum or palladium the result is nearly chemically identical to a true Platinotype. It is believed that many Kallitypes were passed off as true Platinotypes and remain in collections as so. Kallitypes have had a reputation over the years as having poor archival qualities and often fading. When properly cleared, Kallitypes are completely archivable and will not fade. Toning with a metal such as gold, platinum, or palladium will give extra image permanence. Ferrous ions embedded in the paper as a result of poor clearing is the cause of the lack of belief in image permanence. This can be easily identified by a yellow stain in the highlights.

Process

Like the Platinotype and Cyanotype, the kallitype is a contact printing process and the printer must have a negative of equal size to print from. Modern kallitypes are generally made from either a large format camera negative, an enlarged internegative from a traditional wet darkroom, or a digital negative. Cotton rag paper is generally recommended for printing kallitypes, although multiple paper types will lead to satisfactory results. Gloves should be worn during coating and when handling sensitizer as  the sensitizer chemicals can be quite toxic.
While the Van Dyke Brown and Argyrotype are both "printing out" processes (with the complete image being formed during exposure), the Kallitype is a "develop out" process that requires the print to be submerged in a developer solution to make the image visible after exposure. Like the Platinotype, the image will appear instantly when the paper is submerged in the developer.

The final tone of the print is controlled both via the developer choice and through the use of toning solutions such as gold and platinum toners.

References

External links
 Making Kallitype Prints at Unblinking Eye
  The Kallitype Process at alternativephotography.com
  Kallitype Development demonstration on Youtube

Photographic processes dating from the 19th century
Audiovisual introductions in 1889